Sadiq Alhassan (born 15  August 1996) is a Ghanaian professional footballer who currently plays as a midfielder for Ghana Premier League side Karela United FC, whom he serves as the deputy captain.

Career 
Alhassan started his career with then Wa All Stars FC now Legon Cities FC in 2015. He played for the club for 3 seasons till he signed for fellow Ghana Premier League side Karela United FC. He was made a deputy captain of the side along with Diawisie Taylor to club captain Godfred Agyemang Yeboah ahead of the 2020–21 Ghana Premier League season.

Honours 
Wa All Stars

 Ghana Premier League: 2015–16
 Ghana Super Cup: 2017

References

External links 

 

1996 births
Living people
Ghanaian footballers
Legon Cities FC players
Ghana Premier League players
Association football midfielders
Karela United FC players